"I Need a Man" was the third single released by the American band Miami Sound Machine on their first English language album, and eighth studio album overall, Eyes of Innocence. The song was written by the band's drummer and lead songwriter Enrique Garcia.

Song history
This song was released in the United States at the same time that "Prisoner of Love" was released in Europe, which was an exclusive single for the European countries. "I Need a Man" was released as a single in the United States, making it their second single from the album stateside, but third overall.

The single was released as a follow up to the dance club hit, "Dr. Beat"; however, it did not appear on any Billboard chart.

Track listing
 7" single
"I Need A Man" (E. E. Garcia) – 3:42
"Orange Express" (S. Watanabe, L.B. Wright) – 3:30

12" single
"I Need A Man (Special Version)" (E. E. Garcia) – 5:54
"I Need A Man (Instrumental)" (E. E. Garcia) – 4:25

References

1984 singles
Miami Sound Machine songs
Gloria Estefan songs
Songs written by Enrique Garcia (songwriter)
1984 songs
Epic Records singles